Mom Luang Chirayu Navawongs (16 June 1912 – 7 November 2003) was a Thai scholar and privy councillor. He was a professor at Chulalongkorn University, mainly teaching Pali and Sanskrit, and later served as Dean of the Faculty of Arts. He also served as Deputy Minister of Education, and was a fellow of the Royal Society. He was appointed to the Privy Council of King Bhumibol Adulyadej in 1975.

References

Chirayu Navawongs
Chirayu Navawongs
Chirayu Navawongs
Chirayu Navawongs
Chirayu Navawongs
1912 births
2003 deaths